Detunatele is a site of columnar jointing in Alba County, Transylvania, Romania. Detunatele means lightning strike.

The two peaks are located in the Metaliferi Mountains and are a tourist attraction. The formations are shaped like humps and there are stories and legends associated with them. They are considered to be two of the most beautiful peaks in the Apuseni Mountains.

References

External links
The Detunata Write up of a hike up Detunata Flocoasa including photos

Columnar basalts
Geology of Romania
Geography of Alba County
Tourist attractions in Alba County